"Don't It" is a song written by Ross Copperman, Ashley Gorley, and Jaren Johnston and recorded by American country music artist Billy Currington. It was released in October 2014 as the first single from Currington's 2015 album Summer Forever.

The song became Currington's ninth number one hit on the US Billboard Country Airplay chart. It also peaked at number 4 on Hot Country Songs and at number 44 on the Billboard Hot 100. As of July 2015, the song has sold 404,000 units in the United States. The song even became Currington's first number one single on the Canada Country chart, and it reached number 46 on the Canadian Hot 100. The song's accompanying music video was directed by Peter Zavadil.

Reception

Critical
Taste of Country gave the song a favorable review, and stated that "the Georgia-based singer continues to nudge his beach-inspired style forward. [A]n infectious melody and the singer’s charm make this song irresistible."

Commercial
"Don't It" debuted at number 53 on the US Billboard Country Airplay chart for the week of November 8, 2014. It also debuted at number 36 on Hot Country Songs for the week of November 8, 2014. In addition, it even entered the Bubbling Under Hot 100 Singles chart at number 14 for the week of March 7, 2015. It also debuted at number 48 on the Canada Country chart for the week of March 21, 2015, and it entered in at number 76 on the Canadian Hot 100 for the week of April 25, 2015. The song reached number one on the Country Airplay chart for the week of June 6, 2015, becoming Currington's ninth number one country single, and his third consecutive. As of July 2015, the song has sold 404,000 copies in the United States.

Music video
The accompanying music video for the song was directed by Peter Zavadil and premiered in January 2015. The video has Currington performing with his band while also having romantic scenes with a brunette woman.

Chart performance

Year-end charts

Certifications

References

2014 songs
2014 singles
Billy Currington songs
Mercury Nashville singles
Music videos directed by Peter Zavadil
Songs written by Ross Copperman
Songs written by Ashley Gorley
Songs written by Jaren Johnston
Song recordings produced by Dann Huff